The 2022 West Oxfordshire District Council election took place on 5 May 2022 to elect members of West Oxfordshire District Council in Oxfordshire, England. One-third of the council was up for election and the Conservative Party lost control of the council to no overall control.

Results summary

The votes were counted at the Windrush Leisure Centre in Witney. The turnout was given as 39 percent. Following these election results the Conservatives lost control of West Oxfordshire after being in charge for 22 years. The deputy leader of the council lost his seat.

Ward results

Ascott and Shipton

Bampton and Clanfield

Brize Norton and Shilton

Burford

Carterton North East

Carterton North West

Carterton South

Chipping Norton

Ducklington

Eynsham and Cassington

Freeland and Hanborough

Standlake, Aston and Stanton Harcourt

The Bartons

Witney East

Witney South

 
 

 

Losing Conservative candidate, David Harvey, had been the district councillor for 24 years and was the deputy leader of the council.

Woodstock and Bladon

References

West Oxfordshire District Council elections
2020s in Oxfordshire
West Oxfordshire